The Lerderderg River (known locally as The Lerdy) is a perennial river of the Port Phillip catchment, located in the Western District region of the Australian state of Victoria.

Location and features
The river flows generally south by east in a highly meandering course, through the Lerderderg Gorge within the Wombat State Forest where it is joined by two minor tributaries, The Old River and Goodman Creek,  before reaching its confluence with the Werribee River within the Melton Reservoir, southeast of Bacchus Marsh.

A diversion in the river's course, called the Lerderderg River diversion tunnel, located approximately  upriver from Bacchus Marsh, was constructed between 1855 and 1870. The tunnel was driven through a mountain spur in a horseshoe bend, diverting the river, and allowing the exposed river bed to be sluiced for alluvial gold.

The river is known for the Lerderderg Gorge Picnic Ground, camping, bushwalking, and fishing. In earlier days, gold was mined in the upper reaches, and some of the old mines (considered dangerous to enter) can be seen as you travel along the sluice on the east bank, which previously fed into those mines. The water slowed to a trickle during the severe drought of 2007. Even when not flowing, there are still a few popular swimming spots along the river, including "Harry's Hole", "Third Hole", and "The Pit", all of which are in the Lerderderg Gorge.

The river is traversed by the Western Freeway northeast of Bacchus Marsh.

See also

Lerderderg Track
List of rivers of Australia
Wombat State Forest

References 

Melbourne Water catchment
Rivers of Grampians (region)
Bacchus Marsh
Western District (Victoria)